Timothy Henry Clark (born 17 December 1975) is a South African professional golfer who formerly played on the PGA Tour. His biggest win was The Players Championship in 2010, which was also his first PGA Tour win.

Early life and amateur career
Clark was born in Durban, South Africa. He took up golf at the age of three and was taught to play by his father. He attended North Carolina State University in the United States, where he had a successful college golf career, winning ACC Player of the Year in 1997. During this time he won the 1997 U.S. Amateur Public Links to qualify for his first major, the 1998 Masters Tournament.

Professional career
Clark turned professional in 1998, and initially played on the second tier U.S. professional tour, which was then known as the Nike Tour, where he won two tournaments in 2000 to gain membership of the main PGA Tour for 2001. His 2001 campaign was cut short by a wrist injury after just three events. He made a comeback in 2002, and had the benefit of a major medical exemption which enabled him to enter enough events to comfortably regain full exemption for 2003. He captured his first PGA Tour victory at the 2010 Players Championship, becoming only the second golfer to make the Players his first Tour victory. He has had three European Tour victories. He finished sole second at the 2006 Masters Tournament and sole or tied third at the 2003 PGA Championship and the 2005 U.S. Open.
 
Clark was a member of the International Team, captained by fellow South African Gary Player in two of three appearances, in the 2003, 2005 and 2009 Presidents Cup. Player dubbed him the team's "bull dog" in reference to his dogged determination and refusal to give in or let go. In 2005 he reached the top 20 of the Official World Golf Rankings for the first time. He won the Sunshine Tour Order of Merit in the 2001/02 season. He has played Gary Player's annual charity event in South Africa to help raise funds for needy children and personally paid for a little girl's cochlear ear implant so that she could hear after winning the event in 2005. In Australia for a three-tournament swing, he won the 2008 Australian Open in a playoff with Mathew Goggin when they were both tied at 9-under-par. Neither seemed to have a chance with four holes to play when David Smail led at 12-under only to double-bogey the next two holes.

In May 2009, Clark nearly had his first PGA Tour victory in hand at the Crowne Plaza Invitational at Colonial, but he bogeyed the 18th hole to force a playoff. On the first hole of that playoff, he missed a 7-footer which would have given him the victory. Then, on the second playoff hole, he and Steve Marino lost to Steve Stricker. In May 2010, Clark picked up his first PGA Tour title in his 206th start, after eight runner-up finishes, at the 2010 Players Championship. Clark came from three behind with a final round 67 to win by a stroke over Robert Allenby. At the time, Clark was the highest-earning player without a win, earning $14.7 million and having eight runner-up finishes.

On 11 August 2013, in the final round of the PGA Championship at Oak Hill Country Club, Clark made a hole-in-one on the 220-yard, par-3 11th hole. On 27 July 2014, Clark won the RBC Canadian Open, finishing one stroke ahead of Jim Furyk. This was his second PGA Tour title and first victory in more than four years. He birdied five out of the last eight holes to come from three strokes back in the final round. The win moved Clark back inside the world's top 100.

A left elbow injury hampered Clark for much of 2015 and 2016. Clark last played the 2016 CareerBuilder Challenge and has a career money list exemption available. His career earnings are over $23.9 million.

Professional wins (12)

PGA Tour wins (2)

PGA Tour playoff record (0–2)

European Tour wins (3)

1Co-sanctioned by the Sunshine Tour

European Tour playoff record (0–2)

Sunshine Tour wins (2)

1Co-sanctioned by the European Tour

Sunshine Tour playoff record (0–1)

PGA Tour of Australasia wins (1)

PGA Tour of Australasia playoff record (1–0)

Buy.com Tour wins (2)

Canadian Tour wins (2)

Other wins (2)

Other playoff record (1–0)

Results in major championships

CUT = missed the half way cut
"T" indicates a tie for a place.

Summary

Most consecutive cuts made – 5 (2005 Masters – 2006 Masters)
Longest streak of top-10s – 1 (three times)

The Players Championship

Wins (1)

Results timeline

CUT = missed the halfway cut
WD = withdrew
"T" indicates a tie for a place.

Results in World Golf Championships

QF, R16, R32, R64 = Round in which player lost in match play
"T" = tied
Note that the HSBC Champions did not become a WGC event until 2009.

Team appearances
Amateur
Eisenhower Trophy (representing South Africa): 1994

Professional
World Cup (representing South Africa): 2002, 2005
Presidents Cup (International Team): 2003 (tie), 2005, 2009

See also
2000 Buy.com Tour graduates

References

External links

South African male golfers
NC State Wolfpack men's golfers
Sunshine Tour golfers
PGA Tour golfers
European Tour golfers
Sportspeople from Durban
South African people of British descent
White South African people
1975 births
Living people